"Fear (of the Unknown)" is a U.S.-only single written and recorded by English rock band Siouxsie and the Banshees and produced by Stephen Hague. It was released in late 1991 as the second U.S. single from the band's 10th studio album, Superstition. It didn't get any domestic release in the UK and was the only Siouxsie and the Banshees single not to be issued in their home country.

The track, in its original form, was an uptempo dance-oriented number with heavy percussion work by Banshees drummer Budgie. For its release as a single, "Fear (of the Unknown)" was drastically remixed by Junior Vasquez to accentuate its 4/4 rhythm and give it a house music feel. A 12-inch was released with several remixes. When included on the 1992 compilation album Twice Upon a Time - The Singles, the track was presented in the "House of Fear Mix",  the one which had been used for the promo video.

The song became the Banshees' biggest hit on the U.S. Billboard magazine's Hot Dance/Disco chart, climbing to number 6, as it was heavily played by many DJs. "Fear (of the Unknown)" received moderate airplay on American alternative rock radio, peaking at number 12 on Billboard's Modern Rock Tracks chart.

The cover art is an homage to James Stewart's dream sequence in Alfred Hitchcock's film Vertigo.

12" vinyl track listing
"Fear (of the Unknown) (CHR Mix)" *
"Fear (of the Unknown) (House Of Fear Extended Mix)" *
"Fear (of the Unknown) (LP Version)"
"Fear (of the Unknown) (Vertigo Mix)" *
"Fear (of the Unknown) (Urban Fear Mix)" *
"Spiral Twist"

(* remixed by Junior Vasquez)

CD track listing
 "Fear (of the Unknown) (LP Version)"
 "Spiral Twist"
 "I Could Be Again"
 "Fear (of the Unknown) (Vertigo mix)"

Charts

References 

1991 singles
Siouxsie and the Banshees songs
Song recordings produced by Stephen Hague
1991 songs
Geffen Records singles
Songs written by Siouxsie Sioux
Songs written by Budgie (musician)
Songs written by Steven Severin